Mounir Ben Slimane is a Tunisian professional basketball coach. He was the head coach of the United Arab Emirates national basketball team, whom he coached the UAE at the 2009 FIBA Asia Championship in China. He also is the current technical director of the United Arab Emirates Basketball Association.

Ben Slimane started his coaching career in 1986. On April 12, 2021, he signed with US Monastir in Tunisia. He guided the team to a second place in the Basketball Africa League. Monastir lost to Zamalek in the 2021 BAL Finals. Ben Slimane was also an assistant for the Detroit Pistons in the 2022 NBA Summer League.

Head coaching record

BAL 

|-
| style="text-align:left;"|Monastir
| style="text-align:left;"|2021
|3||3||0|||| style="text-align:left;"|1st in Group A||3||1||2||
| style="text-align:center;"|Lost in BAL Finals
|- class="sortbottom"

References

Tunisian basketball coaches
US Monastir basketball coaches
Basketball Africa League coaches
Year of birth missing (living people)
Living people